David E. Bernstein (born 1967) is a law professor at the George Mason University School of Law in Arlington, Virginia, where he has taught since 1995. His primary areas of scholarly research are constitutional history and the admissibility of expert testimony. Bernstein is a contributor to the legal blog The Volokh Conspiracy. Bernstein is a graduate of the Yale Law School, where he was a John M. Olin Fellow in Law, Economics and Public Policy, a Claude Lambe Fellow of the Institute for Humane Studies, and a senior editor of the Yale Law Journal. He received his B.A. degree summa cum laude with honors in History from Brandeis University.

Publications
Books
 Classified: The Untold Story of Racial Classification in America, Bombardier Press, 2022, 
 Lawless: The Obama Administrations Unprecedented Assault on the Constitution and the Rule of Law, Encounter, 2015, 
 A Conspiracy Against Obamacare: The Volokh Conspiracy and the Health Care Case (co-author with several others), Palgrave MacMillan, 2013.
 Rehabilitating Lochner: Defending Individual Rights against Progressive Reform, University of Chicago Press, 2011, 
 You Can't Say That: The Growing Threat to Civil Liberties from Antidiscrimination Laws, Cato Institute, 2003, 
 The New Wigmore: Expert Evidence (treatise, with Kaye and Mnookin) Aspen Publishers, 2004, 
 Only One Place of Redress: African Americans, Labor Regulations and the Supreme Court from Reconstruction to the New Deal, Duke University Press, 2001,  Beito Review
 Phantom Risk: Scientific Inference and the Law (co-editor, with Foster and Huber) The MIT Press, January 29, 1999, 

Selected law review articles and review essays
 The Modern American Law of Race, 94 S. Cal. L. Rev. 171 (2021)
 Antidiscrimination Laws and the Administrative State: A Skeptic’s Look at Administrative Constitutionalism, 94 Notre Dame L. Rev. 1381 (2019)
 "Constitutional Hardball Yes, Asymmetric Not So Much", 118 Colum. L. Rev. Online 207 (2018)
 "The Due Process Right to Earn a Living: A Brighter Future Ahead?", 126 Yale L.J. F. 287 (2016)
 "Substantive Due Process: It's Complicated", 95 Tex. L. Rev. See Also 1 (2016)
 "The Misbegotten Judicial Resistance to the Daubert Revolution", 89 Notre Dame L. Rev. 27 (2014)
 "The Mainstreaming of Libertarian Constitutional Thought", 76 L. & Contemp. Probs. 43 (2014)(with Ilya Somin)
 "The Misbegotten Judicial Resistance to the Daubert Revolution", 89 Notre Dame L. Rev. 27 (2013)
 "Excluding Unfit workers: Social Control Versus Social Justice in the Age of Economic Reform," 72 L. & Contemp. Probs. 177 (2009) (with Thomas C. Leonard)
 "Revisiting Yick Wo v. Hopkins", 2008 Ill. L. Rev. 1393
 "Expert Witnesses, Adversarial Bias, and the (Partial) Failure of the Daubert Revolution", 93 Iowa L. Rev. 451 (2008)
 "The Red Menace Revisited", 100 Nw. U. L. Rev. 1295 (2006)
 "Learning the Wrong Lessons from an American Tragedy", 104 Mich. L. Rev. 1961 (2006)
 "Judicial Power and Civil Rights Reconsidered", 114 Yale L.J. 593 (2004) (with Ilya Somin)
 "Lochner's Feminist Legacy", 101 Mich. L. Rev. 1960 (2003)
 "Lochner's Legacy's Legacy", 82 Tex L. Rev. 1 (2003)
 "Lochner Era Revisionism, Revised: Lochner and the Origins of Fundamental Rights Constitutionalism", 82 Geo. L.J. 1 (2003)
 "Lochner, Parity, and the Chinese Laundry Cases", 41 Wm. &  Mary L. Rev. 211 (1999) (symposium)
 "The Breast Implant Fiasco", 87 Calif. L. Rev. 457 (1999)
 "Philip Sober Restraining Philip Drunk: Buchanan v. Warley in Historical Perspective", 51 Vand. L.  Rev. 799 (1998)
 "The Law and Economics of Post-Civil War Restrictions on Interstate Migration by African-Americans", 74 Tex. L. Rev. 781 (1998)

References

External links
 Profile at the George Mason University School of Law website.
 David E. Bernstein Personal homepage.  Wayback Machine archived link. April 21, 2015.
 Social Science Research Networks.
 

1967 births
Living people
American male bloggers
American bloggers
Brandeis University alumni
George Mason University School of Law faculty
Yale Law School alumni
Cato Institute people